Brian Maher is an American politician who is a member of the New York State Assembly from the 101st district. First elected in 2022, he previously served as the Town Supervisor of Montgomery, New York.

Career
Maher's first elected office was working as a mayor. From 2009 to 2015, he was Mayor of the Village of Walden. After his tenure as Mayor, he ran for Supervisor of the Town of Montgomery, the area in which the Village of Walden is located in. He later won the race. 

Before running for assembly, Maher worked as a communications director for the office of State Senator Bill Larkin. In early 2022, Maher announced candidacy for New York State Assembly for District 101. After winning the election, he was sworn in on January 3, 2023.

References 

Living people
Republican Party members of the New York State Assembly
21st-century American politicians
Year of birth missing (living people)